University station is an Edmonton Light Rail Transit station in Edmonton, Alberta, Canada. It serves both the Capital Line and the Metro Line. It is an underground station located beneath 112 Street at 89 Avenue on the University of Alberta campus. As of 2017, it is the busiest LRT station of the Capital and Metro lines with typical weekday traffic averaging 27,394 passengers.

History
University station was opened August 23, 1992 and was the first LRT station located on the south side of the North Saskatchewan River. It is connected to Government Centre station by the Dudley B. Menzies Bridge, a dedicated LRT bridge (with a lower level for pedestrians and cyclists).  With the exception of the bridge and its approaches, the LRT line between Government Centre station and University station runs through tunnels.

University station was the southern terminus of the LRT line prior to the opening of the Health Sciences station on January 3, 2006.

Station layout

The station has a 123 metre long centre loading platform that can accommodate two five-car LRT trains at the same time, with one train on each side of the platform. The platform is just over eight metres wide. Access to the platform is from a concourse level by stairs and escalators located at each end of the platform. There is also an elevator at the north end of the platform. The concourse level provides access to the surface and to the university's Housing Union Building (HUB).

Public art
University station contains two sets of public art at either end of the concourse. "Tri: Making the Impossible Possible, 2003" is a suspended steel ball surrounded by a triangle, forming an optical illusion. "From Here 2003" is a series of 12 suspended aluminum sculptures. Both pieces were designed by University of Alberta students.

Around the Station
University of Alberta
Dentistry/Pharmacy Building
Education Centre
Fine Arts Building
HUB Mall
Rutherford Library
Timms Centre
Garneau

University Transit Centre

The University Transit Centre is located above the LRT station on the transit and bicycle-only 89 Avenue. The transit centre is served by ETS and Strathcona County Transit (SCT). This transit centre does not have park & ride, a drop off area, public washrooms, pay phones, or vending machines, but does have a large shelter.

The following bus routes serve the transit centre:

The above list does not include LRT services from the adjacent LRT station.

References

External links

Edmonton Light Rail Transit stations
Railway stations in Canada at university and college campuses
Railway stations in Canada opened in 1992
Edmonton Transit Service transit centres
University of Alberta
Capital Line
Metro Line